Senator Barron may refer to:

Dempsey J. Barron (1922–2001), Florida State Senate
Henry D. Barron (1833–1882), Wisconsin State Senate
Lowell Barron (born 1942), Alabama State Senate